Afro-dite is a Swedish pop group made up of three pop singers. The group consists of Blossom Tainton-Lindquist, Gladys del Pilar, and Kayo Shekoni. The name is a play on words implying they are beautiful as Greek goddess Aphrodite and black.

Blossom has already been in showbusiness for a long time. She sings and dances, played in several musicals and even hosted TV-shows on Swedish television.
Gladys, born in Ecuador, came to Sweden when she was only 7 years old. She worked with Dr. Alban and Denniz Pop but her final breakthrough was when she appeared in ABBA - the true story.
Kayo is another multitalented woman. She is not only a singer, but also an actress, TV-show host and model. In the eighties she sang with the pop group Freestyle and in the nineties she fronted the Eurodance project Le Click.

Afro-dite came together to sing the song "Never Let It Go" for the Eurovision Song Contest 2002. The song was originally meant to be sung by Alcazar but they refused. In Eurovision, Afro-dite reached 8th place. In 2007 they released a new album.

In 2012, they made another attempt for Eurovision with the song, "The Boy Can Dance", but were eliminated in the first semi-final of Melodifestivalen.

See also 
 List of Swedes in music

References

Eurovision Song Contest entrants for Sweden
Eurovision Song Contest entrants of 2002
Melodifestivalen winners
Swedish girl groups
English-language singers from Sweden
Musical groups established in 2002
Melodifestivalen contestants of 2012
Melodifestivalen contestants of 2003
Melodifestivalen contestants of 2002